2 Good 2 Be True is a Philippine drama romantic comedy television series broadcast by Kapamilya Channel. Directed by Mae Cruz-Alviar, it stars Kathryn Bernardo and Daniel Padilla. The series premiered on the Kapamilya Channel's Primetime Bida evening block, Jeepney TV, A2Z Primetime Weeknights, and TV5's Todo Max Primetime Singko, and worldwide via The Filipino Channel and Kapatid Channel from May 16 to November 11, 2022, replacing Viral Scandal and was replaced by The Iron Heart.

The drama marked the return of Bernardo and Padilla in primetime television five years after they previously starred together in the 2017 series La Luna Sangre by Star Creatives.

Premise
Car mechanic Eloy (Daniel Padilla) makes a terrible first impression on Ali (Kathryn Bernardo), who works for a real estate magnate. Both of them are hiding their true personas.

Cast and characters

Main cast
Kathryn Bernardo as  Alisson "Ali" Fajardo-Borja: a bubbly, hardworking nurse at a hospital whose dream is to become a doctor.
Daniel Padilla as Elorde "Eloy" A. Borja: an intelligent young mechanic and law student who vows to free his father from jail, Eloy tries to overcome the grief of his mother's death.
Ronaldo Valdez as Sebastian "Hugo" Agcaoili: An elder billionaire who owns a construction firm and the One Pacific hotel chain. Hugo has alzheimer's disease which he hides from all the people around him except for Ali and Eloy. He turns out to be Eloy's biological grandfather.

Supporting cast
Gloria Diaz as Helena Agcaoili
Gelli de Belen as Margielyn "Margie" O. Flores-Fajardo
Cris Villanueva as Rafael Rosales
Romeo Gonzalvo as Nicolas
Romnick Sarmienta as Frederico "Fred" Borja
Irma Adlawan as Heart Borja
Bodjie Pascua as Bartolome "Lolo Bart" Panganiban
Alyssa Muhlach as Jillian "Jill" De Guzman
Leo Rialp as Atty. Jimmy Manansala
Gillian Vicencio as Concepcion "Tox" Baquiran
Bianca de Vera as Patricia "Pat" F. Fajardo
Raul Montesa as Ramon Evangelista
Earl Ignacio as Benjamin "Ben" Baquiran
Smokey Manaloto as Badong Nolasco
Matt Evans as Ays
Yves Flores as Red
Pamu Pamorada as Gemma
Mary Joy Apostol as Queenie
Hyubs Azarcon as Tino
Via Antonio as Chubs

Guest cast
Agot Isidro as Roma Badayos
Ina Raymundo as Olivia Agcaoili
Mickey Ferriols as Hanna Agcaoili / Miriam Santos-Borja
 Keempee de Leon as Jose "Joey / Jay" M. Fajardo
Dominic Ochoa as young Hugo
Isabelle Daza as young Helena
McCoy de Leon as young Fred
Elmo Magalona as Joseph San Pedro
Jenny Miller as Tara Inocencio
Mercedes Cabral as Abegail Rosales
 Adrianna Agcaoili as Michelle Fuentes
 Rafa Siguion-Reyna as Paul Wilson
 Nor Domingo as Eric Ramos
 Michelle Vito as young Hanna/Miriam
 Rhed Bustamante as young Ali

Production
Working title for the project was Tanging Mahal. Pre-production began on August 30, 2021. The series is produced by RGE Drama Unit, the creators of Nang Ngumiti ang Langit, Pamilya Ko and Bagong Umaga. On September 27, 2021, the drama has been officially announced as Too Good to Be True. Principal photography commenced in October 2021.

Reception
2 Good 2 Be True immediately became the number-one most watched TV series on Netflix nationwide, consistently. The pilot episode drew over 130,000 live concurrent viewers on ABS-CBN's YouTube channel. According to AGB Nielsen Philippines, the series premiered with an impressive 8.0% rating, securing the sixth spot of the rating board, despite having only limited reach on Free TV.

Release
2 Good 2 Be True streamed advanced episodes first on Netflix on May 13, 2022, before releasing on other platforms. The series consists of 130 episodes.

See also 
 List of ABS-CBN drama series

Notes

References

External links
 

ABS-CBN drama series
ABS-CBN original programming
Philippine romantic comedy television series
Philippine romance television series
2022 Philippine television series debuts
2022 Philippine television series endings
Television shows set in the Philippines
Filipino-language television shows